Vilkitsky Island is the southernmost island of the De Long group in the northern part of the East Siberian Sea. The nearest island is Zhokhov Island. Administratively Vilkitsky Island belongs to Yakutia, an administrative division of the Russian Federation.

The island is named after Russian hydrographer Andrey Vilkitsky.

Geography
The island is outside of the limits of permanent ice and is unglaciated. At barely  Vilkitsky is the smallest island of the group.

Geology
Judging from bedrock outcrops associated with the central, steepest part of seacliffs on its southern coast, Vilkitsky Island is composed of limburgite, a dense dark gray volcanic rock.  The limburgite is represent by varieties with both crystalline textures and glassy, devitrified matrix. This volcanic rock occurs as both massive intrusions and lava flows, both of which exhibit narrow shear zones. The limburgite contains small olivine phenocrysts and xenoliths of spinel lherzolites. The spinel lherzolite xenoliths of Vilkitsky Island are structurally and mineralogically identical to the xenoliths found on of Zhokhov Island. Based on limited data, volcanism on Vil’kitskii Island occurred between 0.89 and 0.4 Ma. This period of volcanism on Vilkitsky Island correlates with the later stages of olivine alkaline basalt volcanism on Zhokhov Island between 6.1 and 0.4 Ma.

History
Vilkitsky Island was discovered early on the morning of August 20, 1913 by the crew of the Icebreaker Taymyr. Along with the Icebreaker Vaygach, it was part of the Imperial Russian Arctic Ocean Hydrographic Expedition led by Boris Vilkitsky on behalf of the Russian Hydrographic Service in order to chart the last blank areas of Russian maps. Personnel from the Icebreaker Taymyr landed on it and hoisted a Russian flag. On August 24, 1914, a landing party from the Icebreaker Taymyr revisited Vilkitskiy Island and surveyed it. In 1986 and 1988, the Institute of Oceanology of the USSR Academy of Sciences, now known as the Shirshov Institute of Oceanology, and the Geochemical Institute of the USSR Academy of Sciences carried out field studies of the geology of the geology of the Zhokhov and Vilkitsky islands.

See also
List of islands of Russia

References

External links
Anisimov, M.A., and V.E. Tumskoy, 2002, Environmental History of the Novosibirskie Islands for the last 12 ka. 32nd International Arctic Workshop, Program and Abstracts 2002. Institute of Arctic and Alpine Research, University of Colorado at Boulder, pp 23–25.
Schirrmeister, L., H.-W. Hubberten, V. Rachold, and V.G. Grosse, 2005, Lost world - Late Quaternary environment of periglacial Arctic shelves and coastal lowlands in NE-Siberia. 2nd International Alfred Wegener Symposium Bremerhaven, October, 30 - November 2, 2005.

De Long Islands
Islands of the East Siberian Sea
Islands of the Sakha Republic